In mathematics, and especially differential geometry and gauge theory, a connection is a device that defines a notion of parallel transport on the bundle; that is, a way to "connect" or identify fibers over nearby points. A principal G-connection on a principal G-bundle P over a smooth manifold M is a particular type of connection which is compatible with the action of the group G.

A principal connection can be viewed as a special case of the notion of an Ehresmann connection, and is sometimes called a principal Ehresmann connection. It gives rise to (Ehresmann) connections on any fiber bundle associated to P via the associated bundle construction. In particular, on any associated vector bundle the principal connection induces a covariant derivative, an operator that can differentiate sections of that bundle along tangent directions in the base manifold. Principal connections generalize to arbitrary principal bundles the concept of a linear connection on the frame bundle of a smooth manifold.

Formal definition

Let  be a smooth principal G-bundle over a smooth manifold .

In other words, it is an element ω of  such that

Sometimes the term principal G-connection refers to the pair  and  itself is called the connection form or connection 1-form of the principal connection.

Computational remarks 
Most known non-trivial computations of principal G-connections are done with homogeneous spaces because of the triviality of the (co)tangent bundle.

Relation to Ehresmann connections
A principal G-connection ω on P determines an Ehresmann connection on P in the following way.

Conversely, an Ehresmann connection H⊂TP (or v:TP→V) on P defines a principal G-connection ω if and only if it is G-equivariant in the sense that .

Pull back via trivializing section
If the section s is replaced by a new section sg, defined by (sg)(x) = s(x)g(x), where g:M→G is a smooth map, then . The principal connection is uniquely determined by this family of -valued 1-forms, and these 1-forms are also called connection forms or connection 1-forms, particularly in older or more physics-oriented literature.

Bundle of principal connections
The group G acts on the tangent bundle TP by right translation.  The quotient space TP/G is also a manifold, and inherits the structure of a fibre bundle over TM which shall be denoted dπ:TP/G→TM.  Let ρ:TP/G→M be the projection onto M.  The fibres of the bundle TP/G under the projection ρ carry an additive structure.

The bundle TP/G is called the bundle of principal connections .  A section Γ of dπ:TP/G→TM such that Γ : TM → TP/G is a linear morphism of vector bundles over M, can be identified with a principal connection in P.  Conversely, a principal connection as defined above gives rise to such a section Γ of TP/G.

Finally, let Γ be a principal connection in this sense.  Let q:TP→TP/G be the quotient map.  The horizontal distribution of the connection is the bundle

 We see again the link to the horizontal bundle and thus Ehresmann connection.

Affine property
If ω and ω′ are principal connections on a principal bundle P, then the difference  is a -valued 1-form on P which is not only G-equivariant, but horizontal in the sense that it vanishes on any section of the vertical bundle V of P. Hence it is basic and so is determined by a 1-form on M with values in the adjoint bundle

Conversely, any such one form defines (via pullback) a G-equivariant horizontal 1-form on P, and the space of principal G-connections is an affine space for this space of 1-forms.

Examples

Mauer-Cartan connection 
For the trivial principal -bundle  where , there is a canonical connectionpg 49called the Mauer-Cartan connection. It is defined as follows: for a point  define for which is a compositiondefining the 1-form.

Trivial bundle 

  for  a vertical vector
  for any 

Then,  is determined by  because  and we can get by takingSimilarly, the formdefines a 1-form giving the properties 1 and 2 listed above.

Extending this to non-trivial bundles 

Global reformulation of space of connections 

Connection on the complex Hopf-bundle 
The 1-form  defined asforms a connection, which can be checked by verifying the definition. For any fixed  we haveand since , we have -invariance. This is because the adjoint action is trivial since the Lie algebra is Abelian. For constructing the splitting, note for any  we have a short exact sequencewhere  is defined asso it acts as scaling in the fiber (which restricts to the corresponding -action). Taking  we get

The notation is somewhat confusing, but if we expand out each termit becomes more clear (where ).

Induced covariant and exterior derivatives
For any linear representation W of G there is an associated vector bundle  over M, and a principal connection induces a covariant derivative on any such vector bundle. However, the combination dα+ωΛα is.

Curvature form
The curvature form of a principal G-connection ω is the -valued 2-form Ω defined by

The identification of the curvature with this quantity is sometimes called the (Cartan's) second structure equation. Historically, the emergence of the structure equations are found in the development of the Cartan connection. When transposed into the context of Lie groups, the structure equations are known as the Maurer–Cartan equations: they are the same equations, but in a different setting and notation.

Flat connections and characterization of bundles with flat connections 
We say that a connection  is flat if its curvature form . There is a useful characterization of principal bundles with flat connections; that is, a principal -bundle  has a flat connectionpg 68 if and only if there exists an open covering  with trivializations  such that all transition functionsare constant. This is useful because it gives a recipe for constructing flat principal -bundles over smooth manifolds; namely taking an open cover and defining trivializations with constant transition functions.

Connections on frame bundles and torsion
If the principal bundle P is the frame bundle, or (more generally) if it has a solder form, then the connection is an example of an affine connection, and the curvature is not the only invariant, since the additional structure of the solder form θ, which is an equivariant Rn-valued 1-form on P, should be taken into account. In particular, the torsion form on P, is an Rn-valued 2-form Θ defined by

Θ is G-equivariant and horizontal, and so it descends to a tangent-valued 2-form on M, called the torsion. This equation is sometimes called the (Cartan's) first structure equation.

Definition in algebraic geometry

If X is a scheme (or more generally, stack, derived stack, or even prestack), we can associate to it its so-called de Rham stack, denoted XdR. This has the property that a principal G bundle over XdR is the same thing as a G bundle with connection over X.

References

 
 
 

Connection (mathematics)
Differential geometry
Fiber bundles
Maps of manifolds
Smooth functions